Carroll F. Knicely (born c. 1929 in Staunton, Virginia - died November 2, 2006 in Glasgow, Kentucky) was editor and publisher of the Glasgow Daily Times for nearly 20 years (and later, its owner) and served under three Kentucky Governors as commissioner and later Commerce Secretary.

Career in publishing
Knicely started out as an apprentice linotype operator at The News-Virginian.  In 1957, he relocated to Glasgow, Kentucky as the president, editor and publisher of the Glasgow Daily Times.  In 1963, Knicely and his wife Evely became the sole owners of the newspaper and of the Glasgow Publishing Corporation.  He also held interests in several newspapers all over Kentucky and was part owner of a weekly newspaper in Westmoreland, Tennessee.

Knicely served as president of the Kentucky Press Association and president of the Kentucky Journalism Foundation. Under his leadership, the Glasgow Daily Times was named by the Kentucky Press Association as the best newspaper in its class in 1967.

Western Kentucky University
Knicely was a supporter of Western Kentucky University, where he served on the board of regents beginning in 1976. He was instrumental in the success of the university's nationally known journalism department.

Knicely was a philanthropist, donating large sums of money to the Institute for Economic Development and Public Service at the university and to establish the Knicely Professorship in Leadership Studies and to create the Knicely Endowment, a permanent support fund to maintain and upgrade the Institute.

The Carroll Knicely Conference Center at Western Kentucky University's Bowling Green campus is named in his honor.

Civil service
Knicely served as Commerce secretary under Democratic governors Julian Carroll, Martha Layne Collins and Wallace G. Wilkinson.  While serving in the state's Commerce Cabinet as commissioner, he helped secure the location of the General Motors Corvette plant in Bowling Green in 1981. Later, as commerce secretary, he was instrumental in bringing the Toyota plant to Georgetown, Kentucky in 1985.

Personal life
Knicely had two sons and three daughters, four grandchildren, and four great-grandchildren.

External links
Carroll Knicely's obituary

1929 births
2006 deaths
Politicians from Staunton, Virginia
People from Glasgow, Kentucky
American newspaper editors
20th-century American newspaper publishers (people)
American women philanthropists
State cabinet secretaries of Kentucky
Kentucky Democrats
Western Kentucky University people
20th-century American politicians
Journalists from Virginia
20th-century American philanthropists
20th-century American journalists
American male journalists
20th-century women philanthropists